Hermann von Gilm, or Hermann Gilm von Rosenegg (1 November 1812 – 31 May 1864) was an Austrian lawyer and poet.

Born in Innsbruck, he studied law there. He worked from 1840 as a public official in Schwaz, Bruneck and Rovereto. From 1846 he worked in Vienna.

Richard Strauss set several of his Sophienlieder to music. Von Gilm died in Linz.

Selected publications 

 Märzveilchen (1836)
 Sommerfrischlieder aus Natters (1839)
 Sophienlieder (1844)
 Tiroler Schützen-Leben. Festgabe zur Feier der fünfhundertjährigen Vereinigung Tirols mit dem österreichischen Herrscherhause. Wagner, Innsbruck 1863. – Volltext online.
 Gedichte. Zwei Bände. Gerold, Wien 1864-65.
 Band 1. – Volltext online.
 Band 2. – Volltext online.
 Nachtrag (1868)
 Jakob Stainer. Dichtung. In: Jakob Stainer, der Geigenmacher von Absam in Geschichte und Dichtung. Wagner, Innsbruck 1992, S. 137–143. — Volltext online.
 Gedichte. Liebeskind, Leipzig 1894. – Volltext online.

Literature 
 Johann Georg Obrist: Der Dichter Hermann von Gilm: Eine Biographie, 1874
 Arnold von der Passer: Hermann vom Gilm – sein Leben und seine Dichtungen. Liebeskind, Leipzig 1889, OBV.
 
 Hermann von Gilm, Moritz Necker (Hrsg.): Hermann von Gilms Familien- und Freundesbriefe. Schriften des Literarischen Vereins in Wien, Band 17, . Literarischer Verein, Wien 1912, OBV.
 Walther Neuwirth: Herrmann von Gilm. Dissertation. Universität Wien, Wien 1920, OBV.
 Anton Dörrer: Hermann von Gilm und die Jesuiten – ein altes Tiroler Kampfkapitel, nach unbeachteten Briefen und Gedichten. Innsbruck (ca.) 1924, OBV.
 Anton Dörrer, Hermann von Gilm: Hermann von Gilms Weg und Weisen. Tyrolia, Innsbruck 1924, OBV.
 
 Hermann von Gilm, Alois Großschopf (Hrsg.): Aus bergkristallener Schale. Stiasny-Bücherei, Band 24, . Stiasny, Graz (u.a.) 1958, OBV.

External links 
Works by Hermann von Gilm at Projekt Gutenberg-DE (in German)
 https://www.projekt-gutenberg.org/gilm/gedichte/titlepage.html

Austrian male writers
Writers from Innsbruck
1812 births
1864 deaths